Lotte Group is a corporate group started by Korean businessman Shin Kyuk-ho in Tokyo on June 28, 1948 starting with the Japanese Lotte Co., composed of Lotte Holdings (Japan) and Lotte Corporation (South Korea). Shin expanded Lotte to his ancestral country, South Korea, with the establishment of Lotte Confectionery in Seoul on April 3, 1967.

Name 
The source of the company's name is neither Korean nor Japanese, or even Chinese, but German. Shin Kyuk-ho was impressed with Johann Wolfgang von Goethe's The Sorrows of Young Werther (1774) and named his newly founded company Lotte after the character Charlotte in the novel. ("Charlotte" is also the name of premium auditoriums in movie theatres run by Lotte.)

Operations 

Lotte Corporation – is located in Songpa-gu, Seoul and Lotte Holdings Co., Ltd. in Shinjuku, Tokyo. It is controlled by the founder Shin Kyuk-Ho's extended family.

Business
Lotte Group's major businesses are food, retail, chemical, construction, manufacturing, tourism, service, finance, etc.

 Food: Lotte Confectionery, Lotte Chilsung, Lotte Liquor, Lotte Nestle, Lotte Asahi Liquor, Lotte GRS, and others.
 Retail: Lotte Department Store, Lotte Shopping, Lotte Hi-Mart, Lotte Super, Lotte On, Lotter Korea Seven, FRL Korea, and others.
 Chemical/construction/manufacturing: Lotte Construction, Lotte Chemical, Lotte Fine Chemical, Lotte MCC, Lotte E&C, Lotte Aluminium, Lotte Ineos Chemical, Korea Fujifilm, and others.
 Tourism/service/finance: Lotte Global Logistics, Lotte Rental, Lotte Resort, Lotte Duty Free, Lotte World, Lotte Property & Development, Lotte Capital, Lotte Hotels & Resorts, Lotte Giants, Daehong Communications, Lotte Hotel Busan, Lotte International, and others

Sports
Lotte also owns professional baseball teams.
 Chiba Lotte Marines in Japan (1971–present)
 Lotte Giants in Busan, South Korea (1982–present).

Lotte R&D Center
 Korea R&D Center : 201, Magokjungang-ro, Gangseo-gu Seoul, South Korea
 Japan R&D Center : Saitama, Saitama Prefecture, Japan

Controversies
In June 2016, companies of the group were raided by South Korean prosecutors, investigating into a possible slush fund as well as breach of trust involving transactions among the group's companies.  The investigation forced its Hotel Lotte unit to abandon an initial public offering and Lotte Chemical Corp to withdraw from bidding for Axiall Corp.  Vice chairman, Lee In-won, was found dead in August same year.  He was suspected of suicide just hours before being questioned by prosecutors. Lee was considered the top lieutenant of Chairman Shin Dong-bin.

See also 
 Lotte World Tower
 Shin Dong-bin, also known as Akio Shigemitsu
 Chaebol

References

External links 
  (Korean)
  (English)

 
Conglomerate companies established in 1948
Shin family